Chambers Bay is a public golf course in the northwest United States, located in University Place, Washington, on the Puget Sound southwest of Tacoma. The British links-style course is owned by Pierce County and opened for play on June 23, 2007.

Design
Chambers Bay was designed by Robert Trent Jones Jr.  The  course is the centerpiece of a  county park. Pierce County bought the land for $33 million in 1992; the property was formerly a sand-and-gravel quarry, popular with off-road four-wheelers and 

John Ladenburg Sr. was the Pierce County Executive who brought forward the idea to build the course and to build it to host the United States Open golf championship and other championships.  Ladenburg was the Pierce County Executive at the time and the construction of the course and it's expense to construct was very controversial. Ladenburg used his political capitol from having won six straight elections in the County.  He selected the design team and the management team for the course. By the end of August 2022, it will have hosted four USGA national championships in its first 15 years.
The course cost over $20 million to build and many thought it a waste of money and "Ladenburg's Folly".  However the landing of the U.S. Open by Ladenburg silenced those critics when it was reported that the Open generated $134 million in local economic development.

Construction
During construction, 1.4 million cubic yards (1.1 million m³) of dirt and sand (over 100,000 truckloads) were removed, cleaned off site, and returned to sculpt the course. At the time, it was still permitted as a working mine, which meant fewer restrictions for the course

Layout
The course is for walkers only, caddies are available but are optional. Motorized carts are permitted only for those with medical conditions or disabilities, and a caddie must be hired as the driver.

The greens do not have fringes - it is a transparent transition from fairway to green.

Card of the course

Championship Tees

Navy Tees

Source:

Chambers Bay has just one tree, a Douglas fir behind the 15th green.

Operation
The course is operated by Kemper Sports Management of Northbrook, Illinois, which also operates Bandon Dunes on the southern Oregon coast.

The course is part of the Chambers Creek Properties which includes numerous non-golf recreational opportunities including a three-mile loop (5 km) walking trail, part of which travels through the west side of the golf course.

In 2016, a resort was proposed by a private developer, including an 80-room hotel, event and meeting space, and a Tom Douglas restaurant.

After the 2015 U.S Open was played at Chambers Bay, the local economy realized an estimated revenue increase of approximately $150 million, primarily sourced from gains within the tourist and service industries.  Although Pierce County taxpayers were solely responsible for security costs and course preparation for the US Open, other adjoining counties also benefitted economically.

Events
Chambers Bay was the site of the U.S. Amateur in 2010 and hosted the U.S. Open in 2015; these events were awarded by the United States Golf Association (USGA) in early 2008. The record only lasted until the following year when Erin Hills surpassed it by 18 yards.

Eleven months prior to the event, the USGA announced in July 2014 that all final round tickets  and weekly ticket passes for the 2015 U.S. Open were sold out. The tournament was eventually won by Jordan Spieth.
Chambers Bay Golf Course hosted the U.S. Amateur Four-Ball Championship in 2021. Established in 2015, the "Four-Ball" as it is known, is the newest USGA championship and replaces the now-retired U.S. Amateur Public Links Championship which was established in 1922.

In May, 2021, the USGA selected Chambers Bay to host the 2022 United States Women's Amateur Golf Championship, scheduled for August 8–14, 2022. The tournament was won by Saki Baba.

In March, 2023, the USGA selected Chambers Bay to host the 2027 U.S. Junior Amateur and 2033 U.S. Amateur.

Criticism
During the 2015 U.S. Open, Chambers Bay was subject to criticism for its bumpy greens, unfair course design, and poor accessibility for spectators. Nine-time major champion Gary Player called it "the worst golf course I might've ever seen in the 63 years as a professional golfer," and Henrik Stenson said that the greens were like "putting on broccoli."

In 2017, the fine fescue greens were allowed to transition to poa annua, the dominant  In the weeks leading up to the 2015 U.S. Open, warm and dry weather forced extra watering of the greens, which allowed the invasive poa to thrive.

References

External links
 
 Chambers Bay photos

2007 establishments in Washington (state)
Buildings and structures in Pierce County, Washington
Golf clubs and courses in Washington (state)
Sports in the Seattle metropolitan area
Sports venues completed in 2007
Tourist attractions in Pierce County, Washington